Chinachem Group is a corporate group established in Hong Kong by Teddy Wang's father Wang Din Sin (王廷歆).

The early years of the group were dedicated to exploration of and investment in agricultural projects and chemicals. In the 1960s, the Group shifted its focus to the property development, and has been one of the largest property developers in Hong Kong since mid-1970s.

After Teddy Wang's kidnapping and disappearance in 1990, his wife Nina Wang took over the company as the "Chairlady" and built it into a major property developer, making her the richest woman in Asia.

After the death of Nina Wang, her brother Kung Yan-sum has been serving as the Acting Chairman of the Group.

Property and hotels
The Chinachem Group has built over 300 tower blocks in Hong Kong, the most famous of which is Nina Tower, in Tsuen Wan, where the head office is.

The following are some of Chinachem Group's completed developments:
Residential: Villa Cove, Sol City, Serenity Point, Parc City, Parc Inverness, The Papillons, Serenity Peak, Jade Grove, Eden Gate, The Golden Gate, The Lily, Residence 228, Billionnaire Avant, Billionnaire Royale, South Crest
Shopping Malls: Fanling Town Centre, Hilton Plaza, Ho Shun Fook Shopping Centre
Office: Chinachem Tower, Chinachem Hollywood Tower
Hotel: L'hotel Nina, L'hotel Island South, L'hotel Causeway Bay Harbour View, L'hotel elan, Lodgewood by L'hotel, etc

Listing  
The Chinachem Group is privately owned. The Group has been seeking a listing since 1988 but is currently not listed in any stock markets. It was also rumoured that Group might inject assets into its listed affiliates like Enm Holdings Limited and Dan Form Holdings Company Limited in recent years.

References

External links
 Chinachem Group website

 
Conglomerate companies of Hong Kong
Land developers of Hong Kong
Conglomerate companies established in 1974
Entertainment companies established in 1974
1974 establishments in Hong Kong